Israel–Mauritius relations are the bilateral relations between the State of Israel and the Republic of Mauritius. The Israeli embassy in Nairobi, Kenya is accredited to Mauritius. Mauritius has an honorary consul in Tel Aviv, named Regev Naftali.

Overview 
The relations between the State of Israel and the Republic of Mauritius were officially established in 1968, right after Mauritius gained its independence. Mauritius has decided to cut the relations with Israel due to the Boycott of the Sub-Saharan African countries. The relations between the countries re-established on 30 September 1993.

The economic relations between Israel and Mauritius are modest. The bilateral trade between the countries had a total worth of 5.7 Million US Dollars in 2015, 4.1 of them are Israeli exports to Mauritius, and 1.6 of them are Israeli imports from Mauritius.

References 

Mauritius
Bilateral relations of Mauritius